{{Infobox
| bodystyle  = width:20em;
| abovestyle = background:inherit; font-weight:bold;
| labelstyle = background:inherit; white-space:nowrap;
| above      = <small>Harry Potter books</small>Short Stories from Hogwarts of Power, Politics and Pesky Poltergeists
| image      = 
| caption    = 
| label1     = Author
| data1      = J. K. Rowling
| label2     = Illustrator
| data2      = 
| label3     = Genre
| data3      = Fantasy
| label4     = Auction date
| data4      =  
| label5     = Price
| data5      = £2.99 / US$3 / €2.99 
| label6     = Publisher
| data6      = 
| label7     = Publication date
| data7      = 6 September 2016
| label8     = Pages
| data8      = 66
}}Short Stories from Hogwarts of Power, Politics and Pesky Poltergeists is an e-book written by J. K. Rowling. It was released on 6 September 2016 in several languages at the same time.

This book was released at the same time as two others: 
 Hogwarts: An Incomplete and Unreliable Guide
 Short Stories from Hogwarts of Heroism, Hardship and Dangerous Hobbies

In this guide, we find information about Dolores Umbridge, Horace Slughorn, Quirinus Quirrell, Peeves, the Ministry of Magic and Azkaban

References

2016 short story collections
2016 children's books
Books by J. K. Rowling
British short story collections
Fantasy short story collections
Wizarding World books